Xiakou may refer to these towns in China:

Xiakou, Chongqing (峡口), in Nan'an District, Chongqing
Xiakou, Gansu (峡口), in Lintao County, Gansu
Xiakou, Fucheng County (霞口), in Fucheng County, Hebei
Xiakou, Shijiazhuang (下口), in Pingshan County, Hebei
Xiakou, Hubei (峡口), in Xingshan County, Hubei
Xiakou, Ningxia (峡口), in Qingtongxia, Ningxia
Xiakou, Shaanxi (峡口), in Xixiang County, Shaanxi
Xiakou, Zhejiang (峡口), in Jiangshan, Zhejiang
Xiakou (夏口), a former name of Hankou, in modern Wuhan, Hubei

See also
 Battle of Xiakou, fought between the warlords Sun Quan and Liu Biao in 203 in the late Eastern Han dynasty